Nüsttal is a municipality in the district of Fulda, in Hesse, Germany. Its seat is in the village Hofaschenbach.

References

Municipalities in Hesse
Fulda (district)